Exocarpos latifolius is a species of parasitic tree, in the plant family Santalaceae. They have the common names broad leaved ballart, scrub sandal-wood, scrub cherry, oringorin, broad leaved cherry or native cherry. The species is found in monsoon forest, littoral rainforest and occasionally in more open forest types in Malesia and across Northern Australia.

It is a small tree (or large shrub) growing to 10 metres tall, hemiparasitic on the roots of other trees. The leaves are approximately as broad as long, around 4 cm long. Flowers are produced in slender spikes mostly approximately 1 cm long. The fruit is a globular nut on a short stalk. As it ripens the stalk swells and turns red, like an inside out cherry. The fruit is 4–6 mm long and is inedible, though the stalk is, and was used as a traditional food source by Aboriginal Australians. The seed is found on the outside of the fruit, hence the name exocarpus, from the Latin meaning outer. The wood is very fine-grained with little figure but often striking colour variation and was historically used for cabinet work.

The tree was used for many purposes by Aboriginal Australians.The bark was used as a contraceptive. The leaves were burned to repel insects and leaves used in a solution to treat sores.

The 1889 book 'The Useful Native Plants of Australia’ records that Indigenous Australians of Queensland referred to this tree as "Oringorin". Common names included  Broad-leaved "Native Cherry" and "Scrub Sandalwood". It also states that "The fruit is edible."

References

latifolius
Bushfood
Flora of Queensland
Flora of New South Wales
Australian Aboriginal bushcraft
Taxa named by Robert Brown (botanist, born 1773)